The Skiatook is a weekly newspaper in Skiatook, Oklahoma that publishes on Friday. It is published by BH Media. The newspaper is currently edited by Lindsey Renuard.

References

External links
SkiatookJournal.com

Newspapers published in Oklahoma